Nenad Trinajstić (26 October 1936 – 27 August 2021) was a Croatian chemist and one of pioneers of the chemical graph theory.

Life and work
Trinajstić was born in Zagreb. He received M.Sc. and D.Sc. degrees from the University of Zagreb based on work done at the University of Sheffield under John Murrell. His doctoral advisor was Milan Randić. From 1968 to 1970 he was a Postdoctoral fellow under Michael J. S. Dewar at the University of Texas, Austin with whom he has published 16 papers.
He worked at Pliva and Ruđer Bošković Institute eventually becoming a full research professor in 1977 and from 2001 professor emeritus at the University of Zagreb.

His scientific interests are quantum chemistry, mathematical chemistry, chemoinformatics, history of chemistry and philosophy of natural science. He wrote the first monograph on chemical graph theory and introduced several molecular descriptors such as 3-dimensional Wiener index and Zagreb indices (with Ivan Gutman), which are among the more studied topological indices. Independently of Jun-ichi Aihara, he introduced topological resonance energy as a reliable theory of aromaticity. In quantum chemistry he worked on semi-empirical molecular orbital theory and settling conjugated-circuit model on a firm quantum-mechanical basis. Trinajstić has published more than 500 scientific papers, about 150 technical papers and 12 books.

He was a full member of Croatian Academy of Arts and Sciences, a member of International Academy of Mathematical Chemistry and was awarded the Mid–America State Universities Association Distinguished Foreign Scholar Award in 1986 and Croatian National Science Award in 2003. 

Trinajstić died on 27 August 2021 at the age of 85.

References

Selected publications
 
 
 
 
 
 
 
 N. Trinajstic. Chemical Graph Theory. Vols. 1,2. CRC Press: Boca Raton, Florida, 1983; 2nd Ed. 1992.
 
 
 

1936 births
2021 deaths
Croatian chemists
Scientists from Zagreb
Members of the Croatian Academy of Sciences and Arts